Boistrudan (Gallo: Boéz-Trudan) is a commune in the Ille-et-Vilaine department in Brittany in northwestern France.

Population

Inhabitants of Boistrudan are called Boistrudanais in French.

Toponymy 
Bosco Truant in 1197, Boays-Trudant in the 16th century, then Bois-Trudain in 1685, Bois-trudaine around 1780.

Meaning : Truant's wood, Truant can be a surname or the common word for "beggar, tramp" in Old French.

See also
Communes of the Ille-et-Vilaine department

References

External links

Official website 
Mayors of Ille-et-Vilaine Association 

Communes of Ille-et-Vilaine